Bazargan (also Romanized as Bāzargān, Bazirgun, or Bāzergūn) is a village in Herat Province, Afghanistan.

See also
Herat Province

References

Populated places in Herat Province